Terna River is an important tributary of the Manjira River major river in Osmanabad district of Maharashtra & flowing through Ausa & Nilanga taluks in Latur District of Maharashtra. Manjira River, a branch of Godavari River, originates from Balaghat range Hills near at Terkheda Osmanabhad district.

Terna River is the main source for irrigational purposes to the Osmanabad, Ter, Ausa area. Upper Terna Dam Makni Dam erected on this river is an interesting tourist site.

References

Rivers of Maharashtra
Rivers of India